Seoul National University High School is a public high school attached to Seoul National University located in Jongam-dong, Seongbuk-gu, Seoul.

History
The school was founded on September 1, 1946 under the name Seoul National University Middle School (서울대학교 사범대학 부속중학교), serving Grades 7 to 12. It was then divided into a separate middle school and high school on September 1, 1951. The school moved to its current location at Jongam-dong on November 6, 1971, and changed their name to the current Seoul National University High School on March 1, 2001.

The current principal Lee Ki-seong was appointed on September 1, 2011 as the 16th principal of the school. , there are a total of 25,741 graduates.

Notable alumni

 김호진 Kim Ho-jin - Actor
 김두성 Kim Doo-seong - Civil servant
 전상우 Jeon Sang-woo - Civil servant
 김영길 Kim Young-gil - Spaceship engineer
 윤석남 Yoon Seok-nam - Artist
 어윤배 Uh Yoon-bae - 8th and 9th President of Soongsil University
 이기준 Lee Gi-jun - Seoul National University professor
 장수길 Jang Su-gil - Lawyer under Kim & Chang
 장영희 Chang Young-hee - Professor, translator, scholar, essayist
 전광우 Jun Kwang-woo - Professor at Yonsei University's Graduate School of Economic
 이수빈 Lee Soo-bin - Owner of Samsung Lions
 이건희 Lee Kun-hee - Chairman of Samsung
 이영회 Lee Young-hee
 성기학 Seong Gi-hak - President of Korea Federation of Textile Industries
 이희범 Lee Hee-beom - Adviser of LG International Corp.
 송필호 Song Pil-hon - President of the Korea Newspapers Association and vice-chairman of Joongang Ilbo board of directors
 오권용 Kwon Oh-yong - Vice-president of SK Group
 엄창섭 Uhm Chang-seob - 
 김도현 Kim Do-hyun - Mayor of Gangseo-gu from 2006.07.01—2007.10.26
 홍사덕 Hong Sa-deok - Former member of the National Assembly
 이범관 Lee Beom-gwan - Former member of the National Assembly
 김영순 Kim Young-soon - Mayor of Songpa-gu from 2006.07.01—2010.06.30

References

External links
 

High schools in Seoul
Seongbuk District
Seoul National University
Educational institutions established in 1946
1946 establishments in Korea